Mullappally Ramachandran  (born 7 November 1944) is an Indian politician and former president of the Kerala Pradesh Congress Committee (KPCC). He is a member of the Indian National Congress, and the son of Congress leader Mullappally Gopalan.

Mullappally Ramachandran has returned five times consecutively to the 8th, 9th, 10th, 11th and 12th Lok Sabha from Kannur  constituency, a strong fortress of rival party CPI(M). From 2009 to 2019, he was the Member of Parliament for Vatakara constituency. In the 15th Lok Sabha, he was Minister of State for Home Affairs, Govt. of India.

Positions held 

 1969-70: Chairman, Congress Forum for Socialist Action
 1970-71: President, Youth Congress, Calicut district
 1977-82: President, Kerala Pradesh Youth Congress
 1984-89: Member, Consultative Committee, Ministry of Human Resource Development
 1984-: General-Secretary, Pradesh Congress Committee
 1987-88: Member, Committee on Subordinate Legislation
 1987-89: Member, Consultative Committee, Ministry of External Affairs
 1987-90 :Member, Rules Committee
 1988-95: Joint-Secretary, All India Congress Committee (Indira) [A.I.C.C.(I)]
 1990-91: Member, Committee on Estimates
 Member, Consultative Committee, Ministry of Commerce; and Ministry of Tourism
 1991-93: Union Minister of State, Agriculture and Cooperation
 1993-96: Member, Committee on Industry
 Member, Central Advisory Committee on Light Houses
 Member, Select Committee on Transplantation of Human Organs Bill, 1993
 Member, Consultative Committee, Ministry of Information and Broadcasting
 1996-97: Member, Committee on Commerce
 Member, Joint Committee on Salaries and Allowances Of Members of Parliament
 Member, Sub-Committee on Agricultural Exports
 Member, Consultative Committee, Ministry of Railways
 1998-99: Member, Committee on Urban and Rural Development and Convenor of its Sub-Committee-I on Ministry of Urban Affairs and Employment; and Sub-Committee on Action Taken
 Member, Committee to review the rate of dividend payable by the Railway Undertakings 
 Member, Consultative Committee, Ministry of Civil Aviation
 Member, Railway Convention Committee
 Member, South Zone Railway Advisory Committee
 2000: General Secretary, KPCC
 2005: Vice President, KPCC
 2009-2014: Minister of State (Home)
 2015: Chairman, Indian National Congress Central Election Authority 
 2018-2021: President, KPCC

Controversy
In June 2020, he made some controversial comments against the health minister K.K Shailaja, calling her as Covid Rani (Covid Queen). In November 2020, he entered into controversy again as he stated "women with self respect will die if she is raped, or else try not to be sexually assaulted again". Later, he claimed that his remarks on rape survivors are being 'portrayed as anti-women by others.

References

External links

Malayali politicians
India MPs 2009–2014
Politicians from Kozhikode
1944 births
Living people
Indian National Congress politicians from Kerala
India MPs 1984–1989
India MPs 1989–1991
India MPs 1991–1996
India MPs 1996–1997
India MPs 1998–1999
Lok Sabha members from Kerala
India MPs 2014–2019
Government Law College, Thiruvananthapuram alumni